Carystus may refer to:

 Carystus, a very ancient polis (city-state) on the south coast of Euboea, now Karystos
 Carystus (or Karystos), a small modern coastal town on the Greek island of Euboea
 Carystus (Liguria), an ancient town in Liguria, north of Genoa in the territory of Statellae
 Carystus (mythology), the eponym of the town of Carystus on Euboea
 Carystus (skipper), a genus of skipper butterflies in the family Hesperiidae

See also 
 Carystius